Safdar Niazi (born 11 June 1982) is a Pakistani first-class cricketer who played for Islamabad cricket team.

References

External links
 

1982 births
Living people
Pakistani cricketers
Islamabad cricketers
Emirati cricketers
Bahawalpur cricketers
Pakistani emigrants to the United Arab Emirates
Pakistani expatriate sportspeople in the United Arab Emirates